Norman Jefferis "Jeff" Holter (February 1, 1914 – July 21, 1983) was an American biophysicist who invented the Holter monitor, a portable device for continuously monitoring the electrical activity of the heart for 24 hours or more. Holter donated the rights to his invention to medicine.

Early life and education
Holter was born February 1, 1914, in Helena, Montana. He graduated from Carroll College in 1931 and then continued his studies at University of California Los Angeles, graduating from there with a master's degree in physics in 1937. He then graduated a year later from the University of Southern California with a master's degree in chemistry. He continued his education by completing postgraduate work at the University of Heidelberg (Germany), the University of Chicago, the Oak Ridge Institute of Nuclear Studies, and the University of Oregon Medical School.

Career
During World War II, Holter served as senior physicist in the U.S. Navy, studying the characteristics of waves. In 1946, he headed a government research team involved in the atomic-bomb testing at Bikini Atoll. After the war, he continued work with the United States Atomic Energy Commission, and served as president of the Society of Nuclear Medicine from 1955 to 1956. In 1964, he became a full professor at the University of California, San Diego, coordinating activities at the Institute of Geophysics and Planetary Physics. In 1979, the Association for the Advancement of Medical Instrumentation (AAMI) awarded Holter with the AAMI Foundation Laufman-Greatbatch Prize for his contributions to medical technology.

Holter was the son and grandson, respectively, of Montana pioneers Norman B. Holter and Anton M. Holter. Anton M. Holter was born in his native Norway and emigrated to the United States when he was 23. Numerous landmarks in and around Helena, Montana bear his family's name. These landmarks include The Holter Museum of Art, Holter Dam, and Holter Lake.  The Holter Art Museum is widely recognized as the premiere modern western art museum in the United States and attracts the talents and attention of international crowds.

References

1914 births
1983 deaths
American biologists
20th-century American physicists
People from Helena, Montana
20th-century biologists
Inventors from Montana
20th-century American inventors